The Naked Carmen is a 1970 recording by David Hess and John Corigliano. It is described as an "electric rock opera" by the creators.

Critical reception 

Reviewing for The Village Voice in 1970, Robert Christgau panned the album as "the aptest instance of overpretension in the history of rock-is-art", although he said that its country-western version of the Toreador Song "works beautifully".

References

External links
The Naked Carmen, extensive details, Henry Lowengard, echonyc.com

Mercury Records albums
1970 albums
David Hess albums
John Corigliano albums
Collaborative albums
Carmen